James Willys Silliman (August 12, 1905 – October 21, 1976) was a Republican politician from the US State of California, who served in the California State Assembly for the 33rd and 34th district from 1947 to 1955, including serving as Speaker of the Assembly from 1953–1954.  He ran unsuccessfully for lieutenant governor in 1954 and for state senator in 1955.

References

1905 births
1976 deaths
Speakers of the California State Assembly
Republican Party members of the California State Assembly
20th-century American politicians